The Millennium Super Soccer Cup, known as the Sahara Cup for sponsorship reasons, was an international football tournament held in India from 10 January to 25 January 2001. Yugoslavia were the eventual champions after defeating Bosnia and Herzegovina in the final.

Venues

Teams

AFC
 
 
 
 
  (withdrew)
  (withdrew)
  University XI
 
 
CAF
  (withdrew)

CONMEBOL
 
  B
UEFA
 
 
  XI

Results

Group stage

Group I

Group II

Group III

Group IV

The match was originally scheduled for 10 January, but was later postponed as the Chilean team had trouble with its equipment, which was kept at Johannesburg at the day of the match.

Knockout stage

Bracket

Quarter-finals

Semi-finals

Final

Statistics

Goalscorers
3 goals

  Tryggvi Guðmundsson
  Keisuke Ota
  Saša Ilić

2 goals

  Mirsad Bešlija
  Almedin Hota
  Dželaludin Muharemović
  Sebastián González
  Héctor Tapia
  Kwok Yue Hung
  Hideki Sekine
  Juan Selages
  Ricardo Varela
  Bahadir Annamotov
  Oybek Usmankhodjaev
  Igor Bogdanović
  Igor Duljaj

1 goal

  Firoj Mahmud Titu
  Zehrudin Kavazović
  Fernando Martel
  Rodrigo Meléndez
  Marco Villaseca
  Þórhallur Hinriksson
  Yoshimasa Fujita
  Satoshi Horinouchi
  Keiji Yoshimura
  Badran Al-Shaqran
  Haitham Al-Shboul
  Faisal Ibrahim
  Ioan Luca
  Lucian Sânmărtean
  Marius Sasu
  Liviu Zahariuc
  Wilson Martirena
  Daniel Pereira
  Alexandro Umpiérrez
  Aleksei Zhdanov
  Dušan Petković
  Vuk Rašović
  Goran Trobok

References

External links
 Official website
 Tournament page at RSSSF

International association football competitions hosted by India
2000–01 in Bahraini football
2000–01 in Bosnia and Herzegovina football
2000–01 in Hong Kong football
2000–01 in Indian football
2000–01 in Jordanian football
2000–01 in Romanian football
2000–01 in Yugoslav football
2001 in Bangladeshi football
2001 in Chilean football
2001 in Icelandic football
2001 in Japanese football
2001 in Uruguayan football
2001 in Uzbekistani football